Knut Kenneth Gustafsson (11 August 1948 – 3 March 2003), known as Kenta, was a Swedish musician.

Gustafsson was born in Nacka, Sweden. He grew up in Vällingby, a suburb northwest of Stockholm. Early in his life Kenta had problems with alcohol and drug addictions, which was the subject for the three documentaries by Stefan Jarl known as The Mod Trilogy. He competed in the Swedish qualifying round for The Eurovision Song Contest in 1980 with the song Utan att fråga, finishing sixth place. His biggest hit was Just idag är jag stark a song about feeling strong after struggling with addiction. He was known as a supporter of the Swedish football team Hammarby IF who adopted Just idag är jag stark as their anthem.

Gustafsson died of cancer in March 2003 after having been treated at the home of Stefan Jarl and his family in Västergötland. He was buried in the memorial garden at the Solna cemetery.

Selected filmography
 1968 – They Call Us Misfits
 1979 – A Respectable Life
 1993 – From Misfits To Yuppies

Musical Arrangements
 1993 – Det sociala arvet

Discography
 1979 – Kenta
 1981 – Kan det va' fel på systemet?
 1981 – August & Kenta LP
 2000 – Kenta: Guldkorn 1979-81
 2003 – På nattlig vandring

References

1948 births
2003 deaths
20th-century Swedish male musicians